The 2014 Dwars door de Westhoek was the 5th edition a one-day women's cycle race held in Belgium on 20 April 2014. The race had a UCI rating of 1.1.

Results

See also
 2014 in women's road cycling

References

Dwars door de Westhoek
Women's road bicycle races
Dwars door de Westhoek